Vapnet (the weapon or the coat of arms) is a Swedish indie pop band from Östersund, signed by record label Hybris. Lead singer is Martin Abrahamsson, who is also active in the indie pop band Sibiria. Their single "Kalla mig" was a big sleeper hit in Sweden in spring/summer 2005. Their album Jag vet hur man väntar was released April 19, 2006, featuring among other tracks a remix on "Kalla mig" by Swedish soul artist Kaah.  Their song "Håll Ihop," from the EP Något Dåligt Nytt Har Hänt, featured Jens Lekman.

Discography 
Ge Dom Våld (Give Them Violence) (CDR)
Ge Dom Våld (Give Them Violence) (EP)
Thoméegränd (EP) (CD) (Thomée-Alley) (2006)
Jag vet hur man väntar (I know how to wait) (CD) (2006)
Något dåligt nytt har hänt (Something bad new has happened) (EP) (2007)
Döda Fallet (The Dead Fall) (2008)

External links 
 Official Vapnet blog
 Record label Hybrism

Swedish musical groups